No One Is Alone may refer to:

"No One Is Alone" (Desperate Housewives), an episode of Desperate Housewives
"No One Is Alone" (song), from the Stephen Sondheim musical Into the Woods
No One Is Alone, a 2006 album by Glenn Yarbrough
No One Is Alone, a 2007 album by Barbara Cook
No One Is Alone, a 1996 album by Laurie Beechman